First Calvary Baptist Church is a historic African-American Baptist church located in Norfolk, Virginia. It was built in 1915 and 1916 and is a four-story, 11 bay, brick church building in the Second Renaissance Revival style. The building features decorative terra cotta and a stained-glass dome.  It has a two-tier, engaged entrance portico with fluted columns, Corinthian order capitals, and terra cotta entablatures.  The building also has a three-stage bell tower.

It was listed on the National Register of Historic Places in 1987.

References

African-American history of Virginia
20th-century Baptist churches in the United States
Baptist churches in Virginia
Churches on the National Register of Historic Places in Virginia
Renaissance Revival architecture in Virginia
Churches completed in 1916
Churches in Norfolk, Virginia
National Register of Historic Places in Norfolk, Virginia